The West Bengal Pradesh Congress Committee (WBPCC), formerly known as the Bengal Provincial Congress Committee in Colonial India, is the unit of the Indian National Congress for the state of West Bengal.

References

External links
 

Indian National Congress by state or union territory
Indian National Congress of West Bengal
Political history of West Bengal